Cathal Marsh is a former Irish rugby union player who last played for Rugby United New York (RUNY) in Major League Rugby (MLR). His preferred position is fly-half. He previously played for Leinster Rugby.

Professional Rugby Career

It was announced in April 2015 that he had been awarded a senior contract with Leinster Rugby following completion of his time in the academy, having previously played with the Leinster senior team, making his debut in April 2013 against Zebre.

References

External links
 Leinster Profile All Fixtures & Results

1992 births
Living people
Expatriate rugby union players in the United States
Irish expatriate rugby union players
Irish expatriate sportspeople in the United States
People educated at St Michael's College, Dublin
Rugby union players from Dublin (city)
Rugby New York players
Rugby union fly-halves